There were 2 basketball events at the 2014 South American Games.

Medal summary

Medal table

Men's basketball

Group stage
|}

Bronze-medal match

Gold-medal match

Women's basketball

Group stage
|}

Bronze-medal match

Gold-medal match

References

2013–14 in South American basketball
basketball
2014
International basketball competitions hosted by Chile